Daniel Santa Cruz Ferreira Almeida (born 22 April 1984), simply known as Daniel Almeida is a Portuguese professional footballer playing for Real S.C. as a defender.

Club career
Born in Lisbon, Almeida kicked off his career with Odivelas with whom he made first team debut. He made 6 appearances in two seasons, before plying his trade in lower division clubs with União Santiago and Sintrense between 2004 and 2007.

He then joined Real. He failed to make first team impact and hence rejoined Sintrense to get more first team opportunities. During his second time in Sintrense, he made a record by scoring 7 goals in a match against Rio Maior. Scoring 16 goals in 25 league matches, he switched clubs joining Igreja Nova in 2009.

In 2010, he signed for Oriental. He became an important member of the team. Since then he has made more than 20 appearances in each season for the club. He played a crucial role in the club's promotion to Segunda Liga in 2013, making 32 appearances, scoring in 4 in the 2013–14 season.

References

External links
 
 

1984 births
Living people
Association football defenders
Portuguese footballers
Odivelas F.C. players
S.U. Sintrense players
Real S.C. players
Clube Oriental de Lisboa players
C.D. Cova da Piedade players
U.D. Vilafranquense players
Liga Portugal 2 players
Segunda Divisão players
Footballers from Lisbon